"Keii" is a song by Puerto Rican rapper and singer Anuel AA and was released on February 7, 2020. The song debuted at number two in Spain and reached number 83 on the US Billboard Hot 100.

Composition 
"Keii" was described as a "laid-back dembow swing". In the song, the singer name-drops several songs from fellow artists, such as Daddy Yankee's "Con Calma", Bad Bunny's "Callaíta", Don Omar's "Hasta Abajo", DJ Snake's "Taki Taki", Nio García's "Te Boté", Nicky Jam and J Balvin's "X" and more.

Music video 
The video was released on February 7, 2020, and portrays the artist as Dracula. It was directed by Spiff TV. The storyline was compared to a "gothic romance" in which the singer lures a woman from her wedding into a dark world full of "rampant pleasure".

Charts

Weekly charts

Year-end charts

Certifications

See also 
 List of Billboard Hot Latin Songs and Latin Airplay number ones of 2020

References 

2020 singles
2020 songs
Anuel AA songs
Spanish-language songs